An energy transition is a significant structural change in an energy system regarding supply and consumption. Currently, a transition to sustainable energy is underway, driven by a recognition that global greenhouse-gas emissions must be brought to zero. This process involves downshifting fossil fuels and re-developing whole systems to operate on low carbon energy sources. 

As of 2019, 85% of the world's energy needs are met by burning fossil fuels. Energy production and consumption are responsible for 76% of annual human-caused greenhouse gas emissions as of 2018. To meet the goals of the 2015 Paris Agreement on climate change, emissions must be reduced as soon as possible and reach net-zero by mid-century. Since the late 2010s, the renewable energy transition is also driven by the rapidly increasing competitiveness of both. Another motivation for the transition is to limit other environmental impact of the energy industry.

The renewable energy transition includes a shift from internal combustion engine powered vehicles to more public transport, reduced air travel and electric vehicles. Electrification also regards the buildings sector, with heat pumps as the most efficient technology by far. For electrical grid scale flexibility, energy storage and super grids are vital to allow for variable, weather-dependent technologies.

The industrial revolution was driven by an energy transition from wood and other biomass to coal, followed by oil and most recently natural gas.  Historically, there is a correlation between an increasing demand for energy and availability of different energy sources. The historical transitions from locally-supplied wood, water and wind energies to globally supplied fossil and nuclear fuels has induced growth in end-use demand through the rapid expansion of engineering research, education and standardisation. The mechanisms for the whole-systems changes include new discipline in Transition Engineering amongst all engineering professions, entrepreneurs, researchers and educators.

Definition

An energy transition is a broad shift in technologies and behaviours that are needed to replace one source of energy with another. A prime example is the change from a pre-industrial system relying on traditional biomass, wind, water and muscle power to an industrial system characterized by pervasive mechanization, steam power and the use of coal.

After the 1973 oil crisis, the term was coined by politicians and media. It was popularised by US President Jimmy Carter in his 1977 Address on the Nation on Energy, calling to "look back into history to understand our energy problem. Twice in the last several hundred years, there has been a transition in the way people use energy ... Because we are now running out of gas and oil, we must prepare quickly for a third change to strict conservation and to the renewed use of coal and to permanent renewable energy sources like solar power." The term was later globalised after the 1979 second oil shock, during the 1981 United Nations in Nairobi on new and renewable sources of energy.

From the 1990s, debates on energy transition have increasingly taken climate change mitigation into account. Since the adoption of the COP21 Paris Agreement in 2015, all 196 participating parties have agreed to reach carbon neutrality by mid-century. Parties to the agreement committed "to limit global warming to "well below 2 °C, preferably 1.5 °C compared to pre-industrial levels". This requires a rapid energy transition with a downshift of fossil fuel production to stay within the carbon emissions budget.

In this context, the term 'energy transition' encompasses a reorientation of energy policy. This could imply a shift from centralized to distributed generation. It also includes attempts to replace overproduction and avoidable energy consumption with energy-saving measures and increased efficiency. In a broader sense the energy transition could also entail a democratization of energy.

History of energy transitions and energy additions

Historic approaches to past energy transitions are shaped by two main discourses. One argues that humankind experienced several energy transitions in its past, while the other suggests the term "energy additions" as better reflecting the changes in global energy supply in the last three centuries.

The chronologically first discourse was most broadly described by Vaclav Smil. It underlines the change in the energy mix of countries and the global economy. By looking at data in percentages of the primary energy source used in a given context, it paints a picture of the world's energy systems as having changed significantly over time, going from biomass to coal, to oil, and now a mix of mostly coal, oil and natural gas. Until the 1950s, the economic mechanism behind energy systems was local rather than global.

The second discourse was most broadly described by Jean-Baptiste Fressoz. It emphasises that the term "energy transition" was first used by politicians, not historians, to describe a goal to achieve in the future – not as a concept to analyse past trends. When looking at the sheer amount of energy being used by humankind, the picture is one of an ever-increasing energy consumption that is met by an ever-increasing consumption of all the main energy sources available to humankind. For instance, the increased use of coal in the 19th century indeed did not replace wood consumption, but came on top of increased wood consumption. Another example is the deployment of passenger cars in the 20th century. This evolution triggered an increase in both oil consumption (to drive the car) and coal consumption (to make the steel needed for the car). In other words, according to this approach, humankind never performed a single energy transition in its history but performed several energy additions.

Contemporary energy transitions differ in terms of motivation and objectives, drivers and governance.  As development progressed, different national systems became more and more integrated becoming the large, international systems seen today. Historical changes of energy systems have been extensively studied. While historical energy changes were generally protracted affairs, unfolding over many decades, this does not necessarily hold true for the present energy transition, which is unfolding under very different policy and technological conditions.

For current energy systems, many lessons can be learned from history. The need for large amounts of firewood in early industrial processes in combination with prohibitive costs for overland transportation led to a scarcity of accessible (e.g. affordable) wood and it has been found that eighteenth century glass-works "operated like a forest clearing enterprise". When Britain had to resort to coal after largely having run out of wood, the resulting fuel crisis triggered a chain of events that two centuries later culminated in the Industrial Revolution. Similarly, increased use of peat and coal were vital elements paving the way for the Dutch Golden Age, roughly spanning the entire 17th century. Another example where resource depletion triggered technological innovation and a shift to new energy sources in 19th Century whaling and how whale oil eventually became replaced by kerosene and other petroleum-derived products.  With the success of a rapid energy transition it is also conceivable that there will be government buyouts or bailouts of coal mining regions.

Factors driving the low carbon energy transition

A rapid energy transition to very-low or zero-carbon sources is required to mitigate the existential effects of climate change. The rise in weather and climate extremes has already led to irreversible impacts as natural and human systems are pushed beyond their ability to adapt. Coal, oil and gas combustion account for 89% of  emissions while they still provide 78% of primary energy consumption.
By 2050, burning coal must be reduced by 95%, oil by 60% and gas by 45% compared to 2019 in order to achieve a 50% chance to meet the Paris Agreement target of limiting global heating to 1.5 °C. This refers to pathways with no or limited overshoot.

In spite of the knowledge about the risks of climate change since the 1980s and the vanishing carbon budget for a 1.5 °C path, the global deployment of renewable energy could not catch up with the increasing energy demand for many years. Coal, oil and gas were cheaper. Only in countries with special tariffs and subsidies, wind and solar power gained a considerable share, limited to the power sector.

From 2010 to 2019, competitiveness of wind and solar power has massively increased. Unit costs of solar energy dropped sharply by 85%, wind energy by 55%, and lithium-ion batteries by 85%, making wind and solar power the cheapest form for new installations in many regions. Levelized costs for combined photovoltaics with storage for a few hours are already lower than for gas peaking power plants. In 2021, the new electricity generating capacity of renewables exceeded 80% of all installed power.

Another important driver is energy security and independence, with increasing importance in Europe from the background of the 2022 Russian invasion of Ukraine.

The deployment of renewable energy can also include co-benefits of climate change mitigation: positive socio-economic effects on employment, industrial development, health and energy access. Depending on the country and the deployment scenario, replacing coal power plants can more than double the number of jobs per average MW capacity. In non-electrified rural areas, the deployment of solar mini-grids can significantly improve electricity access. Employment opportunities by the green transition are associated with the use of renewable energy sources or building activity for infrastructure improvements and renovations. Additionally, the replacement of coal-based energy with renewables can lower the number of premature deaths caused by air pollution and reduce health costs.

Goverment's ambition to attract international support for green growth initiatives and public demand for clean environment have been found to be drivers for energy transition in developing countries such as Vietnam

Current technologies

Renewable energy

The energy sources that are considered the most important in the low carbon energy transition are wind power and solar power. Both offer the potential to reduce net emissions by 4 Gt CO2 equivalents per year each, half of it with lower net lifetime costs than the reference. 

By 2022, hydroelectricity is the largest source of renewable electricity in the world, providing 16% of the world's total electricity in 2019. However, because of its heavy dependence on geography and the generally high environmental and social impact of hydroelectric power plants, the growth potential of this technology is limited. Wind and solar power are considered more scalable, but still require vast quantities of land and materials. They have higher potential for growth. These sources have grown nearly exponentially in recent decades thanks to rapidly decreasing costs. In 2019, wind power supplied 5.3% worldwide electricity while solar power supplied 2.6%.

While production from most types of hydropower plants can be actively controlled, production from wind and solar power depends on the weather. Electrical grids must be extended and adjusted to avoid wastage. Hydropower is therefore considered a dispatchable source, while solar and wind are variable renewable energy sources. These sources require dispatchable backup generation or energy storage to provide continuous and reliable electricity. For this reason, storage technologies also play a key role in the renewable energy transition. As of 2020, the largest scale storage technology is pumped storage hydroelectricity, accounting for the great majority of energy storage capacity installed worldwide. Other important forms of energy storage are electric batteries and power to gas.

Other renewable energy sources include bioenergy, geothermal energy and tidal energy, coming at higher costs. 

Regarding energy use and efficiency the electrification of road transport is one key technology.

Nuclear power

In the 1970s and 1980s, nuclear power gained a large share in some countries. In France and Slovakia more than half of the electrical power is still nuclear. It is regarded as a low carbon energy source but comes with risks and increasing costs. Since the late 1990s, deployment has slowed down. Decommissioning increases as many reactors are close to the end of their lifetime. Germany has announced to stop its last three nuclear power plants by mid April 2023. On the other hand, the China General Nuclear Power Group has articulated the goal of 200 GW by 2035, produced by 150 additional reactors.

Integration of variable energy sources

With the integration of renewable energy, local electricity production is becoming more variable. Sector coupling, energy storage, smart grids, demand side management, sustainable biofuels, hydrogen electrolysis and derivatives will ultimately be needed to accommodate large shares of renewables in energy systems. Fluctuations can be smoothened by combining wind and sun power and by extending electricity grids over large areas. This reduces the dependence on local weather conditions.

In countries with a considerable amount of renewable energy, solar energy causes price drops around noon every day. PV production follows the higher demand during these hours. The images show two weeks in 2022 in Germany, where renewable energy has a share of over 40%. Prices also drop every night and weekend due to low demand. In hours without PV and wind power, electricity prices rise. This can lead to demand side adjustments.
While industry is dependent on the hourly prices, most private households still pay a fixed tariff. With smart meters, private consomers can also be motivated i.e. to load an electric car when enough renewable energy is available and prices are cheap.

Steerable flexibility in electricity production is essential to back up variable energy sources. The German example shows that pumped hydro storage, gas plants and hard coal jump in fast. Lignite varies on a daily basis. Nuclear power and biomass can theoretically adjust to a certain extent. However, in this case incentives still seem not be high enough.

With highly variable prices, electricity storage and grid extension become more competitive. Costs for accommodating the integration of variable renewable energy sources in electricity systems are expected to be modest until 2030.  It will be more challenging to supply the entire energy system with renewable energy.

Fast fluctuations increase with a high integration of wind and solar energy. They can be addressed by operating reserves. Large-scale batteries can react within seconds and are increasingly used to keep the electricity grid stable.

Economic and geopolitical aspects 

A shift in energy sources has the potential to redefine relations and dependencies between countries, stakeholders and companies. Countries or land owners with resources – fossil or renewable – face massive losses or gains depending on the development of any energy transition. In 2021, energy costs reached 13% of the global gross domestic product.
Global rivalries have contributed to the driving forces of the economics behind the low carbon energy transition. Technological innovations developed within a country have the potential to become an economic force.

Influences 
The energy transition discussion is heavily influenced by contributions from the fossil fuel industries. 
One way that oil companies are able to continue their work despite growing environmental, social and economic concerns is through lobbying efforts within local and national government systems. Lobbying is defined as to conduct activities aimed at influencing public officials and especially members of a legislative body on legislation

Historically, the fossil fuel lobby has been highly successful in limiting regulations. From 1988 to 2005, Exxon Mobil, one of the largest oil companies in the world, spent nearly $16 million in anti-climate change lobbying and providing misleading information about climate change to the general public. The fossil fuel industry acquires significant support through the existing banking and investment structure. The concept that the industry should no longer be financially supported has led to the social movement known as divestment. Divestment is defined as the removal of investment capital from stocks, bonds or funds in oil, coal and gas companies for both moral and financial reasons

Banks, investing firms, governments, universities, institutions and businesses are all being challenged with this new moral argument against their existing investments in the fossil fuel industry and many such as Rockefeller Brothers Fund, the University of California, New York City and more have begun making the shift to more sustainable, eco-friendly investments.

Social aspects

Impacts 

One of the positive social impacts that is predicted is the use of local energy sources to provide stability and economic stimulation to local communities. Not only does this benefit local utilities through portfolio diversification, but it also creates opportunities for energy trade between communities, states and regions. Additionally, energy security has been a struggle worldwide that has led to many issues in the OPEC countries and beyond. Energy security is evaluated by analyzing the accessibility, availability, sustainability, regulatory and technological opportunity of our energy portfolio. Renewable Energy presents an opportunity to increase our energy security by becoming energy independent and have localized grids that decrease energy risks geopolitically. In this sense, the benefits and positive outcomes of the renewable energy transition are profound.

There are also risks and negative impacts on society because of the renewable energy transition that need to be mitigated. The coal mining industry plays a large part in the existing energy portfolio and is one of the biggest targets for climate change activists due to the intense pollution and habitat disruption that it creates. The transition to renewable is expected to have decrease the need and viability of coal mining in the future. This is a positive for climate change action, but can have severe impacts on the communities that rely on this business. Coal mining communities are considered vulnerable to the renewable energy transition. Not only do these communities face energy poverty already, but they also face economic collapse when the coal mining businesses move elsewhere or disappear altogether. These communities need to quickly transition to alternative forms of work to support their families, but lack the resources and support to invest in themselves. This broken system perpetuates the poverty and vulnerability that decreases the adaptive capacity of coal mining communities. Potential mitigation could include expanding the program base for vulnerable communities to assist with new training programs, opportunities for economic development and subsidies to assist with the transition. Ultimately, the social impacts of the renewable energy transition will be extensive, but with mitigation strategies, governments can ensure that it becomes a positive opportunity for all citizens.

Concerns about social impacts of increasing energy prices have been found a key barrier to energy transtion in developing countries including Vietnam and Indonesia .

Metal and mineral extraction
The renewable energy transition has begun to stimulate debate considering it requires a rapid increase in extraction of some kinds of metals and minerals. Mining processes are generally associated with environmental and societal impacts. On the other hand, a renewable energy transition decreases the environmental damage by fossil fuel exploration.

The International Energy Agency does not recognise shortages of resources but states that supply could struggle to keep pace with the world’s climate ambitions. Electric vehicles (EV) and battery storage are expected to cause the most demand. Wind farms and solar PV are less consuming. The extension of electrical grids requires large amounts of copper and aluminium. The IEA recommends to scale up recycling. By 2040, quantities of copper, lithium, nickel and cobalt from spent batteries could reduce combined primary supply requirements for these minerals by around 10%. EV producers have been working to reduce the amount of cobalt in batteries. But this implies, in many cases, an increase in the quantity of nickel. Cobalt-free batteries are already available for commercial use.

The demand for lithium by 2040 is expected to grow by the factor of 42. Graphite, cobalt and nickel exploration is predicted to grow about 20-fold. For each of the most relevant minerals and metals, a significant share of resources are concentrated in only one country: copper in Chile, nickel in Indonesia, cobalt in the Democratic republic of Congo (DRC), rare earths in China and lithium in Australia. China dominates processing of them all. 

A controversial approach is deep sea mining. Minerals can be collected from new sources like polymetallic nodules lying on the seabed, but this could damage biodiversity. Ongoing research is exploring this as a way to facilitate the energy transition in a more sustainable manner.

Risks and barriers
Despite the widespread understanding that a transition to low carbon energy is necessary, there are a number of risks and barriers to making it more appealing than conventional energy. Low carbon energy rarely comes up as a solution beyond combating climate change, but has wider implications for food security and employment. This further supports the recognized dearth of research for clean energy innovations, which may lead to quicker transitions. Overall, the transition to renewable energy requires a shift among governments, business, and the public. Altering public bias may mitigate the risk of subsequent administrations de-transitioning – through perhaps public awareness campaigns or carbon levies.

Amongst the key issues to consider in relation to the pace of the global transition to renewables is how well individual electric companies are able to adapt to the changing reality of the power sector. For example, to date, the uptake of renewables by electric utilities has remained slow, hindered by their continued investment in fossil fuel generation capacity.

Labour 
A large portion of the global workforce works directly or indirectly for the fossil fuel economy. Moreover, many other industries are currently dependent on unsustainable energy sources (such as the steel industry or cement and concrete industry). Transitioning these workforces during the rapid period of economic change requires considerable forethought and planning. The international labor movement has advocated for a just transition that addresses these concerns.

Recently, an energy crisis is upon the nations of Europe as a result of dependence on Russia's natural gas, which was cut off in the wake of the Russia-Ukraine war.
This goes to show that humanity is still heavily dependent on fossil fuel energy sources and care should be taken to have a smooth transition, less energy-shortage shocks cripple the very efforts to effectively energise the transition.

Predictions

After a transitional period, renewable energy production is expected to make up most of the world's energy production. In 2018, the risk management firm, DNV GL, forecasts that the world's primary energy mix will be split equally between fossil and non-fossil sources by 2050. A 2011 projection by the International Energy Agency expects solar PV to supply more than half of the world's electricity by 2060, dramatically reducing the emissions of greenhouse gases.

The GeGaLo index of geopolitical gains and losses assesses how the geopolitical position of 156 countries may change if the world fully transitions to renewable energy resources. Former fossil fuels exporters are expected to lose power, while the positions of former fossil fuel importers and countries rich in renewable energy resources is expected to strengthen.

Status in specific countries 

From 2000–2012 coal was the source of energy with the total largest growth. The use of oil and natural gas also had considerable growth, followed by hydropower and renewable energy. Renewable energy grew at a rate faster than any other time in history during this period. The demand for nuclear energy decreased, in part due to fear mongering and inaccurate media portrayal of some nuclear disasters (Three Mile Island in 1979, Chernobyl in 1986, and Fukushima in 2011).
More recently, consumption of coal has declined relative to low carbon energy. Coal dropped from about 29% of the global total primary energy consumption in 2015 to 27% in 2017, and non-hydro renewables were up to about 4% from 2%.

Australia 

Australia has one of the fastest deployment rates of renewable energy worldwide. The country has deployed 5.2 GW of solar and wind power in 2018 alone and at this rate, is on track to reach 50% renewable electricity in 2024 and 100% in 2032. However, Australia may be one of the leading major economies in terms of renewable deployments, but it is one of the least prepared at a network level to make this transition, being ranked 28th out of the list of 32 advanced economies on the World Economic Forum's 2019 Energy Transition Index.  Nuclear energy is banned in Australia.

China 

China is the largest emitter of greenhouse gases, and plays a key role in the low carbon energy transition and climate change mitigation. China has a goal to be carbon neutral by 2060.

European Union 

The European Green Deal is a set of policy initiatives by the European Commission with the overarching aim of making Europe climate neutral in 2050. An impact assessed plan will also be presented to increase the EU's greenhouse gas emission reductions target for 2030 to at least 50% and towards 55% compared with 1990 levels. The plan is to review each existing law on its climate merits, and also introduce new legislation on the circular economy, building renovation, biodiversity, farming and innovation. The president of the European Commission, Ursula von der Leyen, stated that the European Green Deal would be Europe's "man on the Moon moment", as the plan would make Europe the first climate-neutral continent.

A survey found that digitally advanced companies put more money into energy-saving strategies. In the European Union, 59% of companies that have made investments in both basic and advanced technologies have also invested in energy efficiency measures, compared to only 50% of US firms in the same category. Overall, there is a significant disparity between businesses' digital profiles and investments in energy efficiency.

Austria 

Austria embarked on its energy transition (Energiewende) some decades ago. Due to geographical conditions, electricity production in Austria relies heavily on renewable energies, specifically hydropower. 78.4% of domestic electricity production in 2013 came from low carbon energy, 9.2% from natural gas and 7.2% from petroleum. On the basis of the Federal Constitutional Law for a Nuclear-Free Austria, no nuclear power stations are in operation in Austria.

Domestic energy production makes up only 36% of Austria's total energy consumption, which among other things encompasses transport, electricity production, and heating. In 2013, oil accounts for about 36.2% of total energy consumption, renewable energies 29.8%, gas 20.6%, and coal 9.7%. In the past 20 years, the structure of gross domestic energy consumption has shifted from coal and oil to new renewables. The EU target for Austria require a renewables share of 34% by 2020 (gross final energy consumption).

Energy transition in Austria can be also seen on the local level, in some villages, towns and regions. For example, the town of Güssing in the state of Burgenland is a pioneer in independent and sustainable energy production. Since 2005, Güssing has already produced significantly more heating (58 gigawatt hours) and electricity (14 GWh) from renewable resources than the city itself needs.

Denmark 

Denmark, as a country reliant on imported oil, was impacted particularly hard by the 1973 oil crisis. This roused public discussions on building nuclear power stations to diversify energy supply. A strong anti-nuclear movement developed, which fiercely criticized nuclear power plans taken up by the government, and this ultimately led to a 1985 resolution not to build any nuclear power stations in Denmark. The country instead opted for renewable energy, focusing primarily on wind power. Wind turbines for power generation already had a long history in Denmark, as far back as the late 1800s. As early as 1974 a panel of experts declared "that it should be possible to satisfy 10% of Danish electricity demand with wind power, without causing special technical problems for the public grid." Denmark undertook the development of large wind power stations – though at first with little success (like with the Growian project in Germany).

Small facilities prevailed instead, often sold to private owners such as farms. Government policies promoted their construction; at the same time, positive geographical factors favored their spread, such as good wind power density and Denmark's decentralized patterns of settlement. A lack of administrative obstacles also played a role. Small and robust systems came on line, at first in the power range of only 50–60 kilowatts – using 1940s technology and sometimes hand-crafted by very small businesses. In the late seventies and the eighties a brisk export trade to the United States developed, where wind energy also experienced an early boom. In 1986 Denmark already had about 1200 wind power turbines, though they still accounted for just barely 1% of Denmark's electricity. This share increased significantly over time. In 2011, renewable energies covered 41% of electricity consumption, and wind power facilities alone accounted for 28%. The government aims to increase wind energy's share of power generation to 50% by 2020, while at the same time reducing carbon dioxide emissions by 40%.
On 22 March 2012, the Danish Ministry of Climate, Energy and Building published a four-page paper titled "DK Energy Agreement", outlining long-term principles for Danish energy policy.

The installation of oil and gas heating is banned in newly constructed buildings from the start of 2013; beginning in 2016 this will also apply to existing buildings. At the same time an assistance program for heater replacement was launched. Denmark's goal is to reduce the use of fossil fuels 33% by 2020. The country is scheduled to attain complete independence from petroleum and natural gas by 2050.

France 

Since 2012, political discussions have been developing in France about the energy transition and how the French economy might profit from it.

In September 2012, Minister of the Environment Delphine Batho coined the term "ecological patriotism". The government began a work plan to consider starting the energy transition in France. This plan should address the following questions by June 2013:
 How can France move towards energy efficiency and energy conservation? Reflections on altered lifestyles, changes in production, consumption, and transport.
 How to achieve the energy mix targeted for 2025? France's climate protection targets call for reducing greenhouse gas emissions 40% by 2030, and 60% by 2040.
 Which renewable energies should France rely on? How should the use of wind and solar energy be promoted?
 What costs and funding models will likely be required for alternative energy consulting and investment support? And how about for research, renovation, and expansion of district heating, biomass, and geothermal energy? One solution could be a continuation of the CSPE, a tax that is charged on electricity bills.

The Environmental Conference on Sustainable Development on 14 and 15 September 2012 treated the issue of the environmental and energy transition as its main theme.

On 8 July 2013, the national debate leaders submits some proposals to the government. Among them, there were environmental taxation, and smart grid development.

In 2015, the National Assembly has adopted legislation for the transition to low emission vehicles.

France is second only to Denmark as having the world's lowest carbon emissions in relation to gross domestic product.

Germany 

Germany has played an outsized role in the transition away from fossil fuels and nuclear power to renewables. The energy transition in Germany is known as die Energiewende (literally, "the energy turn") indicating a turn away from old fuels and technologies to new one. The key policy document outlining the Energiewende was published by the German government in September 2010, some six months before the Fukushima nuclear accident; legislative support was passed in September 2010.

The policy has been embraced by the German federal government and has resulted in a huge expansion of renewables, particularly wind power. Germany's share of renewables has increased from around 5% in 1999 to 17% in 2010, reaching close to the OECD average of 18% usage of renewables.  Producers have been guaranteed a fixed feed-in tariff for 20 years, guaranteeing a fixed income. Energy co-operatives have been created, and efforts were made to decentralize control and profits. The large energy companies have a disproportionately small share of the renewables market. Nuclear power stations were closed, and the existing nine stations will close earlier than necessary, in 2022.

The reduction of reliance on nuclear stations has had the consequence of increased reliance on fossil fuels. One factor that has inhibited efficient employment of new renewable energy has been the lack of an accompanying investment in power infrastructure to bring the power to market. It is believed 8300 km of power lines must be built or upgraded.

Different Länder have varying attitudes to the construction of new power lines. Industry has had their rates frozen and so the increased costs of the Energiewende have been passed on to consumers, who have had rising electricity bills. Germans in 2013 had some of the highest electricity costs in Europe.  Nonetheless, for the first time in more than ten years, electricity prices for household customers fell at the beginning of 2015.

India 
India has set renewable energy goals to transition 50% of its total energy consumption into renewable sources in the Paris climate accords. As of 2022 the Central Electricity Authority are well on track of achieving their goals, producing 160 GW electricity from clean sources like solar, wind, hydro power and nuclear power plants, this is 40% of its total capacity. India is ranked third on Ernst and Young's renewable energy country attractive index behind the USA and China. 

Hydro electric power plants are a major part of India's energy infrastructure since the days of its independence in 1947. Former prime Minister Jawahar Lal Nehru called them the " temples of modern India" and believed them to be key drivers of modernity and industrialism for the nascent republic. Notable examples of hydro power stations include the 2400 MW Tehri hydropower complex, the 1960 MW Koyna hydroelectric project and the 1670 MW Srisailam Dam. Recently, India has given due importance to emerging renewable technologies like solar power plants and wind farms.

While there has been positive change, India has to cut down its reliance on traditional coal based power production as it still accounts for around 50% of its energy production. India is also moving towards it goal for electrification of the automotive industry, aiming to have at least 30% EV ownership among private vehicles by 2030.

South Korea 

The South Korean Ministry of Trade, Industry, and Energy (MOTIE) has claimed that an energy transition is necessary in order to comply with the public's demands for their lives, their safety, and the environment. In addition, the ministry has stated that the direction of the future energy policy is "to transition (from conventional energy sources) to safe and clean energy sources." Unlike in the past, the keynote of the policy is to put emphasis on safety and the environment rather than on stability of supply and demand and economic feasibility and is to shift its reliance on nuclear power and coal to clean energy sources like renewables.

In 1981, the primary energy was sourced predominantly by oil and coal with oil accounting for 58.1% and coal 33.3%. As the shares of nuclear power and liquefied natural gas have increased over the years, the share of oil has decreased gradually. The primary energy broke down as follows in 1990: 54% oil, 26% coal, 14% nuclear power, 3% liquefied natural gas, and 3% renewables. Later on, with efforts to reduce greenhouse gas emissions in the country through international cooperation and to improve environmental and safety performances, it broke down as follows in 2017: 40% oil, 29% coal, 16% liquefied natural gas, 10% nuclear power, and 5% renewables. Under the 8th Basic Plan for Long-term Electricity Supply and Demand, presented at the end of 2017, the shares of nuclear and coal are getting decreased while the share of renewables is expanding.

In June 2019, the Korean government confirmed the Third Energy Master Plan, also called a constitutional law of the energy sector and renewed every five years. Its goal is to achieve sustainable growth and enhance the quality of life through energy transition. There are five major tasks to achieve this goal. First, with regards to consumption, the goal is to improve energy consumption efficiency by 38% compared to the level of 2017 and to reduce energy consumption by 18.6% below the BAU level by 2040. Second, with respect to generation, the task is to bring a transition towards a safe and clean energy mix by raising the share of renewable energy in power generation (30~35% by 2040) and by implementing a gradual phase-out of nuclear power and a drastic reduction of coal. Third, regarding the systems, the task is to raise the share of distributed generation nearby where demand is created with renewables and fuel cells and to enhance the roles and responsibility of local governments and residents. Fourth, with regards to the industry, the task is to foster businesses related to renewables, hydrogen, and energy efficiency as a future energy industry, to help the conventional energy industry develop higher value-added businesses, and to support the nuclear power industry to maintain its main ecosystem. The fifth task is to improve the energy market system of electricity, gas, and heat in order to promote energy transition and is to develop an energy big data platform in order to create new businesses.

Switzerland 

Due to the high share of hydroelectricity (59.6%) and nuclear power (31.7%) in electricity production, Switzerland's per capita energy-related  emissions are 28% lower than the European Union average and roughly equal to those of France. On 21 May 2017, Swiss voters accepted the new Energy Act establishing the 'energy strategy 2050'. The aims of the energy strategy 2050 are: to reduce energy consumption; to increase energy efficiency ; and to promote renewable energies (such as water, solar, wind and geothermal power as well as biomass fuels). The Energy Act of 2006 forbids the construction of new nuclear power plants in Switzerland.

United Kingdom 

By law production of greenhouse gas emissions by the United Kingdom will be reduced to net zero by 2050.  To help in reaching this statutory goal national energy policy is mainly focusing on the country's off-shore wind power and delivering new and advanced nuclear power. The increase in national renewable power – particularly from biomass – together with the 20% of electricity generated by nuclear power in the United Kingdom meant that by 2019 low carbon British electricity had overtaken that generated by fossil fuels.

In order to meet the net zero target energy networks must be strengthened.  Electricity is only a part of energy in the United Kingdom, so natural gas used for industrial and residential heat and petroleum used for transport in the United Kingdom must also be replaced by either electricity or another form of low-carbon energy, such as sustainable bioenergy crops or green hydrogen.

Although the need for the energy transition is not disputed by any major political party, in 2020 there is debate about how much of the funding to try and escape the COVID-19 recession should be spent on the transition, and how many jobs could be created, for example in improving energy efficiency in British housing. Some believe that due to post-covid government debt that funding for the transition will be insufficient. Brexit may significantly affect the energy transition, but this is unclear . The government is urging UK business to sponsor the climate change conference in 2021, possibly including energy companies but only if they have a credible short term plan for the energy transition.

United States 

The Obama administration made a large push for green jobs, particularly in his first term. The Trump administration, however, took action to reverse the pro-environmental policies of his predecessor, including withdrawing the United States from the Paris Climate Accords.

In the United States, the share of renewable energy in electricity generation has grown to 21% (2020). Oil use is expected to decline in the US owing to the increasing efficiency of the vehicle fleet and replacement of crude oil by natural gas as a feedstock for the petrochemical sector. One forecast is that the rapid uptake of electric vehicles will reduce oil demand drastically, to the point where it is 80% lower in 2050 compared with today.

In December 2016, Block Island Wind Farm became the first commercial US offshore wind farm. It consists of five 6 MW turbines (together 30 MW) located near-shore ( from Block Island, Rhode Island) in the Atlantic Ocean.
At the same time, Norway-based oil major Statoil laid down nearly $42.5 million on a bid to lease a large offshore area off the coast of New York.

100% renewable energy

100% renewable energy is an energy system where all energy use is sourced from renewable energy sources. The endeavor to use 100% renewable energy for electricity, heating/cooling and transport is motivated by global warming, pollution and other environmental issues, as well as economic and energy security concerns.
Shifting the total global primary energy supply to renewable sources requires a transition of the energy system, since most of today's energy is derived from non-renewable fossil fuels.

According to the Intergovernmental Panel on Climate Change there are few fundamental technological limits to integrating a portfolio of renewable energy technologies to meet most of total global energy demand. Renewable energy use has grown more quickly than even advocates anticipated.

100% renewable energy in a country is typically a more challenging goal than carbon neutrality. The latter is a climate mitigation target, politically decided by many countries, and may also be achieved by balancing the total carbon footprint of the country (not only emissions from energy and fuel) with carbon dioxide removal and carbon projects abroad.

 according to REN21 transformation is picking up speed in the power sector, but urgent action is required in heating, cooling and transport. There are many places around the world with grids that are run almost exclusively on renewable energy. At the national level, at least 30 nations already have renewable energy contributing more than 20% of the energy supply.

According to a review of the 181 peer-reviewed papers on 100% renewable energy which were published until 2018, "[t]he great majority of all publications highlights the technical feasibility and economic viability of 100% RE systems." While there are still many publications which focus on electricity only, there is a growing number of papers that cover different energy sectors and sector-coupled, integrated energy systems. This cross-sectoral, holistic approach is seen as an important feature of 100% renewable energy systems and is based on the assumption "that the best solutions can be found only if one focuses on the synergies between the sectors" of the energy system such as electricity, heat, transport or industry.

Stephen W. Pacala and Robert H. Socolow of Princeton University have developed a series of "climate stabilization wedges" that can allow us to maintain our quality of life while avoiding catastrophic climate change, and "renewable energy sources", in aggregate, constitute the largest number of their "wedges".

Mark Z. Jacobson, professor of civil and environmental engineering at Stanford University and director of its Atmosphere and Energy program, says that producing all new energy with wind power, solar power,  and hydropower by 2030 is feasible, and that existing energy supply arrangements could be replaced by 2050. Barriers to implementing the renewable energy plan are seen to be "primarily social and political, not technological or economic". Jacobson says that energy costs today with a wind, solar, and water system should be similar to today's energy costs from other optimally cost-effective strategies. The main obstacle against this scenario is the lack of political will.  His conclusions have been disputed by other researchers. Jacobson published a response that disputed the piece point by point and claimed that the authors were motivated by allegiance to energy technologies that the 2015 paper excluded.

Similarly, in the United States, the independent National Research Council has noted that "sufficient domestic renewable resources exist to allow renewable electricity to play a significant role in future electricity generation and thus help confront issues related to climate change, energy security, and the escalation of energy costs ... Renewable energy is an attractive option because renewable resources available in the United States, taken collectively, can supply significantly greater amounts of electricity than the total current or projected domestic demand."

The main barriers to the widespread implementation of large-scale renewable energy and low-carbon energy strategies are political rather than technological. According to the 2013 Post Carbon Pathways report, which reviewed many international studies, the key roadblocks are: climate change denial, the fossil fuels lobby, political inaction, unsustainable energy consumption, outdated energy infrastructure, and financial constraints.

Plans and models

See also 

 Carbon bubble
 Individual and political action on climate change
 Just transition
 Mobility transition
 Modal shift
 Nuclear power proposed as renewable energy
 Hydrogen economy
 Timeline of sustainable energy research 2020–present
 List of countries by renewable electricity production
 List of energy storage projects
 List of renewable energy topics by country and territory

Sources

IPCC reports 

Sixth Assessment Report

Other references

References

Further reading 

 Chappells, Heather, Vanessa Taylor, eds. "Energizing the Spaces of Everyday Life: Learning from the Past for a Sustainable Future," RCC Perspectives: Transformations in Environment and Society 2019, no. 2. doi.org/10.5282/rcc/8735.

External links 

 Renewables 100 Policy Institute
 Net Zero Foundation—Education and Leadership of the transition to Net Zero fossil fuel.
 Live carbon emissions from electricity generation
 Global 100% Renewable Energy Campaign

Energy infrastructure
Emissions reduction
Energy policy
Energy development
Renewable energy
Renewable energy commercialization